Culiseta annulata is a species of mosquito in the family Culicidae. It is found in the  Palearctic.

Ecology 
Culiseta annulata overwinters in adult stage. In Northern Europe, females of this species are found in caves from autumn to early spring together with females of genus Culex (Cx. pipiens, Cx. torrentium, and Cx. territans).

References

External links
Images representing Culiseta at BOLD

Culicinae
Insects described in 1776
Nematoceran flies of Europe
Taxa named by Franz von Paula Schrank